Boscardin is an Italian surname. Notable people with the surname include:

 Bruno Boscardin (born 1970), Swiss racing cyclist
 Maria Bertilla Boscardin (1888–1922), Italian nun and nurse

Italian-language surnames
Surnames of South Tyrolean origin